Fryman is the surname of the following people
Pamela Fryman (born 1959), American sitcom director and producer
Richard Fryman (born 1935), American politician in Kentucky
Travis Fryman (born 1969), American baseball player
Woodie Fryman (1940–2011), American baseball pitcher

See also
Meyer Fryman House, US national historic place